Oriulus is a genus of millipedes in the family Parajulidae. There are about eight described species in Oriulus.

Species
These eight species belong to the genus Oriulus:
 Oriulus delus Chamberlin, 1940
 Oriulus eutypus Chamberlin, 1940
 Oriulus georgicolens Chamberlin, 1940
 Oriulus grandiceps Loomis, 1968
 Oriulus grayi Causey, 1950
 Oriulus medianus Chamberlin, 1940
 Oriulus notus Chamberlin, 1940
 Oriulus venustus (Wood, 1864)

References

Further reading

 
 

Julida
Articles created by Qbugbot